Ku-ring-gai Wildflower Garden is a  botanical garden in St Ives, in the northern suburbs of Sydney, New South Wales, Australia.

History
The Garden was established in 1966 by John Wrigley on behalf of Ku-ring-gai Council. (Wrigley went on to establish the Australian National Botanic Gardens in Canberra in 1970.) It was opened by the then Governor of New South Wales, Sir Roden Cutler VC, in 1968.

Features
All of the plants in the Garden are Australian natives. Swamp wallabies are found within the Garden. The dominant species of birds found in the Garden are honeyeaters.
Lamberts Clearing (named after the botanist Aylmer Bourke Lambert) is an open green space, and has a covered picnic area. There is a Fern House, which houses cycads, mossy ponds and ferns, and a Knoll Garden, which is a bush garden. Mueller Track (named after the first director of the Royal Botanic Gardens, Melbourne, Ferdinand von Mueller) is a path into the valley below the carpark. Ku-ring-gai Creek and Tree Fern Gully Creek intersect at Whipbird Gully. There is a nursery within the Garden for the purchase of plants. Caley's Pavilion (named after the botanist George Caley) is a function room, available for wedding hire.

There is a Wildflower & Garden Festival on the last Sunday of August each year.

An elderly volunteer, Gaida Coote, disappeared in 2014, having attended a volunteer bush care group; her remains were only found in 2019.

References

External links

Botanical gardens in New South Wales
1968 establishments in Australia
St Ives, New South Wales